Stephens Branch is a stream in Cooper County in the U.S. state of Missouri. It is a tributary of Petite Saline Creek.

Stephens Branch bears the surname of an early settler.

See also
List of rivers of Missouri

References

Rivers of Cooper County, Missouri
Rivers of Missouri